William McDonough may refer to:
William McDonough, American architect
William Joseph McDonough (1934–2018), Federal Reserve Bank of New York chairman
William McDonough (jockey), took part in four Grand Nationals in the 1830s and 40s